Longbridge Mill is a restored water mill situated on the River Loddon in the village of Sherfield on Loddon in the English county of Hampshire. The mill is now incorporated into a public house and restaurant, but is still occasionally used for demonstration millings.

External links
Web page on Longbridge Mill from Sherfield Parish Council

Tourist attractions in Hampshire
Watermills in Hampshire